Bedevil, Bedeviled, Bedevilled or The Bedevilled may refer to:

Film
Bedevilled (1955 film), American crime drama by Mitchell Leisen
Fear No Evil (1969 film) (also known as Bedevilled), 1969 American TV film by Paul Wendkos
The Bedevilled (film), 1974 Hong Kong horror film by Lo Wei
Bedevil, 1993 Australian horror film by Tracey Moffatt
Bedevilled (2010 film), South Korean horror/thriller by Jang Cheol-soo
Bedeviled (2016 film), American supernatural horror film

Literature
Bedeviled, 2009 novel by American romance novelist Maureen Child

See also
The Bee-Deviled Bruin, 1949 American short animated film under the Looney Tunes banner
Bedevilled Rabbit, 1957 American short animated film starring Bugs Bunny
"The Case of the Bedeviled Doctor", 1959 episode of the second season of the American TV series Perry Mason